Angraecum rutenbergianum is a species of orchid native to Madagascar.

rutenbergianum
Orchids of Madagascar
Plants described in 1882
Taxa named by Friedrich Wilhelm Ludwig Kraenzlin